Gisela Sailer (born 8 May 1962) is a German sports shooter. She competed in the women's 10 metre air rifle event at the 1984 Summer Olympics.

References

External links
 

1962 births
Living people
German female sport shooters
Olympic shooters of West Germany
Shooters at the 1984 Summer Olympics
People from Unterallgäu
Sportspeople from Swabia (Bavaria)